Işıklı is a Turkish name meaning (literally "luminous" or "with lights") and may refer to:

 Işıklı, Aydın, a village in Aydın district of Aydın Province, Turkey
 Işıklı, Enez
 Işıklı, Kozan, a village in Kozan district of Adana Province, Turkey
 Işıklı, Silifke, a village in Silifke district of Mersin Province, Turkey
 Işıklı Lake, a lake in western Turkey
 Işıklı, Mecitözü
 Işıklı, Mudanya
 Işıklı Dam, a dam in Turkey
 Işıklı, Viranşehir, a village in the district of Viranşehir, Şanlıurfa Province

See also
 Işıklı Yol, a 2007 album by İzel